Ridin' Pretty is a 1925 American silent Western film directed by Arthur Rosson and starring William Desmond, Ann Forrest, and Stanhope Wheatcroft.

Plot
As described in a review in a film magazine, Arizona cowboy Sky Parker (Desmond) goes to San Francisco to claim an inheritance left him by his uncle. He takes five cowboys with him. The "boys" have a hectic time, among the adventures include a ride through the city on borrowed truck horses from a brewery, a stunt for which they are arrested. A cousin of Sky persuades Maize, a young woman, to assist him in getting the inheritance away from Sky, but she relents and runs away. Sky rides a motorcycle to catch and board her train, winds her consent to marriage, and throws out his cousin.

Cast

Preservation
A print of Ridin' Pretty is in the collection of EYE Film Institute Netherlands.

References

Bibliography
 Munden, Kenneth White. The American Film Institute Catalog of Motion Pictures Produced in the United States, Part 1. University of California Press, 1997.

External links
 

1925 films
1925 Western (genre) films
Films directed by Arthur Rosson
Silent American Western (genre) films
Universal Pictures films
1920s English-language films
1920s American films